Tablo ID (literally Tablo ID) is a Ukrainian celebrity illustrated news website, paying significant attention to the public life of Ukrainian politicians and statesmen. Tablo ID is a part of the Ukrayinska Pravda group. Published in Ukrainian.

Its news/scoops are sometimes published by the "more serious" Ukrainian media like ''Korrespondent.

An example of a typical Tablo ID scoop is an early 2012 photo of (then) Culture Minister Mykhailo Kulynyak wearing a luxury wristwatch worth his 3-month salary;<ref> Міністр Кулиняк носить на руці майже 42 тисячі, Tablo ID (20 January 2012)</</ref> previously Tablo ID also investigated (and published about) the (viewed as luxurious) lifestyle of former Ukrainian Prime Minister Yulia Tymoshenko, President Viktor Yanukovych and other important politicians.

See also
 Ukrayinska Pravda

References

External links
Табло ID 

Ukrainian news websites
Infotainment
Internet properties established in 2005
Ukrayinska Pravda